Fever is a 2013 young-adult dystopian novel written by Lauren DeStefano.  It was published on February 12. 2012, by Simon & Schuster Book's For Young Readers. It takes place in a dystopian future where scientists have created a generation of perfect humans, who suffer from no illnesses or disorders. However, an unforeseen virus derived from the cure plagues the children and the grandchildren of the perfection generation and kills females at age 20 and males at age 25. This leads to a dramatic crisis in the population with the young dying and the perfect generation reaching old age, and a race to create a cure. It is the second book of The Chemical Garden Trilogy. The first book, Wither, was released in March 2011. The third and final book, Sever, was released in December 2013.

Plot 
Fever takes place in a future where genetic sciences have created a cure of all diseases and illness for humanity. This cure allows for the "First Generation" of perfect humans free from ailments. The First Generation live long and healthy lives, but their children and grandchildren suffer from a virus created from the cure which kills the younger generations. The virus kills females at the age of 20 and males at the age of 25. This creates a dramatic crisis in population and a disparity between the rich and poor. Females are valued for research or sold into prostitution by Gatherers.

After being kidnapped by Gatherers in Manhattan, Rhine Ellery was sold to Linden Ashby and forced to marry him. After gaining the trust of Linden and befriending a servant Gabriel, Rhine and Gabriel escape the Florida mansion and start the journey to reunite with her twin brother Rowan back in New York.

Beginning the trek back to New York, Gabriel and Rhine face dangerous roads and the threat of being recaptured. Rhine and Gabriel become the captors of a circus caravan that doubles as a brothel, and are forced to stay with the troop and perform a star-crossed lovers act. Here, they meet a prostitute named Lilac and her disabled daughter, Maddie. The group hatch a plan to escape the troop, and are successful; however, Lilac does not make it out with them. Continuing their journey to New York, Rhine, Gabriel, and Maddie must continue to evade the search efforts of Housemaster Vaughn. When they make it to New York, Rhine finds that her house is burnt down and there is no trace of her brother. Gabriel is suffering from drugs given to him in at the circus, and Rhine is beginning to feel the effects of the virus despite her age, and so Rhine and Gabriel decide to stay at an orphanage that is run by Maddie's grandmother – a first generation woman.

By the end of the novel, Rhine is in danger of succumbing to the virus as her fever rises and her hair falls out. Then Housemaster Vaughn finds her, and offers her a chance to reverse the effects of the virus and Rhine is faced with a hard decision of what she is willing to sacrifice for freedom.

Main characters 
Rhine Ellery: A sixteen-year-old girl from Manhattan who was kidnapped to be Linden's wife.  She is the narrator and protagonist of the novel.  Rhine has heterochromia, one blue eye and one brown eye.
Linden Ashby: A young architect who has married Rhine, Jenna, Cecily, and Rose.
Cecily: The youngest of the sister wives at 13.  
Rose: Linden's first wife, 20 years old, is secluded to her bed because of her age.
Vaughn Ashby: Linden's father and Housemaster of the Florida mansion. He is searching for a cure to the virus, and is willing to do anything to achieve it. 
Gabriel: One of the servants in the mansion. He is assigned to Rhine, and later escapes with her. 
Rowan Ellery: Rhine's twin brother, whom they are searching for back in New York. 
Lilac: A prostitute from the circus brothel. She plans an escape attempt with Rhine and Gabriel but does not make it out.
Maddie: The mentally and physically disabled daughter of Lilac. She escapes from the brothel with Rhine and Gabriel and is reunited with her maternal First Generation grandmother.

Publication history 
Fever was published as a hardcover in the United States on February 12, 2013, by Simon & Schuster Children's Book's For Young Readers.

References

External links 
 Publisher's website
 Official trilogy website
 Official author's website

2013 American novels

American science fiction novels
Dystopian novels
American young adult novels
Simon & Schuster books